Aandhikhola is a Gaupalika in Syangja District in the Gandaki Province of central Nepal. On 12 March 2017, the government of Nepal implemented a new local administrative structure consisting of 744 local units. With the implementation of the new local administrative structure, VDCs have been replaced with municipal & village councils. Aandhikhola is one of these 744 local units. Aandhikhola is created by merging Faparthum, Chilaunebas, Bichari Chautara, Wangsing Deurali, Setidobhan & (1,2,4-6,8,9) Wards of Panchamul.

Political situation
Aandhikhola is divided into 6 Wards. It is surrounded by Fedikhola at northern side, Putalibazar & Fedikhola from east, Parbat District from west and Putalibazar & Arjun Chaupari at south. Krishee is its headquarter.

Population
Aandhikhola is created by merging Faparthum, Chilaunebas, Bichari Chautara, Wangsing Deurali, Setidobhan & (1,2,4-6,8,9) Wards of Panchamul. The sum population of Aandhikhola, 16,589, is residing in an area of 69.61 km2.

References

See also

Syangja District
Rural municipalities in Syangja District
Rural municipalities of Nepal established in 2017